Red Leaf or Red Leaves may refer to:

Red Leaf, Arkansas, a community in the United States
Red leaf lettuce, a group of lettuce cultivars
Red Leaf Records
Red Leaf Resources
Red Leaves, a short story by William Faulkner
Red Leaves / 紅葉, an English/Japanese magazine
Taitung Red Leaves, a former Taiwanese Little League team